The 2016 Gloucester City Council election took place on 5 May 2016 to elect members of Gloucester City Council in England. All seats are up for election at the same time due to boundary changes. This was on the same day as other local elections. The council also changed from electing a third of the council to electing the entire council. They were originally planned for 7 May 2020,  but postponed until 6 May 2021 due to the COVID-19 pandemic.

Results

|}

Ward results

Abbeydale

Abbeymead

Barnwood

Barton and Tredworth

Coney Hill

Elmbridge

Grange

Hucclecote

Kingsholm and Wotton

Kingsway

Longlevens

Matson and Robinswood

Moreland

Podsmead

Quedgeley Fieldcourt

Quedgeley Severn Vale

Tuffley

Westgate

By-Elections

Longlevens
A by-election was held in Longlevens ward on 3 November 2016, following the death of Jim Porter.

Barnwood
A by-election was held in Barnwood ward on 25 July 2019

Podsmead
A by-election was held in Podsmead ward on 25 July 2019

References

2016 English local elections
2016
2010s in Gloucestershire